The 1991 Refuge Assurance League was the twenty-third competing of what was generally known as the Sunday League.  The competition was won for the first time by Nottinghamshire County Cricket Club.

The season

Somerset played Lancashire at Taunton on Friday 5 July 1991 to be the first Sunday League game not to be played on a Sunday.

Nottinghamshire beat Derbyshire, the previous seasons champions, in the final round of matches at Trent Bridge to claim the title. Tom Moody of Worcestershire had an excellent season scoring a record 917 runs (including 5 centuries).

Standings

Batting averages

Bowling averages

Refuge Assurance Cup

Following the end of the Sunday League season, the top four teams in the Sunday League competed for the Refuge Assurance Cup. Worcestershire emerged as victors, defeating Lancashire in the final.

See also
Sunday League

References

Refuge
Pro40